From January 27 to June 8, 1976, voters of the Democratic Party chose its nominee for president in the 1976 United States presidential election. Former Georgia governor Jimmy Carter was selected as the nominee through a series of primary elections and caucuses culminating in the 1976 Democratic National Convention held from July 12 to July 15, 1976, in New York City.

Schedule and results

Primary race

The Watergate scandal, resignation of Richard Nixon, American withdrawal from Vietnam, and recession of 1974-75 dominated domestic issues in the runup to the presidential election of '76. President Gerald Ford had squandered his early popularity with an unconditional pardon of Nixon and his perceived mishandling of the recession, and by late 1975 had slumped badly in national polls.

Due to the absence of any clear front-runner for the nomination and a political climate that seemed tilted heavily in their party's favor, a record number of Democrats competed for their party's presidential nomination in 1976. However, most of these candidates would drop out early in the race.

The 1976 campaign featured a record number of state primaries and caucuses, and it was the first presidential campaign in which the primary system was dominant. However, most of the Democratic candidates failed to realize the significance of the increased number of primaries, or the importance of creating momentum by winning the early contests. The one candidate who did see the opportunities in the new nominating system was Jimmy Carter, a former state senator and Governor of Georgia. Carter, who was virtually unknown at the national level, would never have gotten the Democratic nomination under the old, boss-dominated nominating system, but given the public disgust with political corruption following Richard Nixon's resignation, Carter realized that his obscurity and "fresh face" could be an asset in the primaries. Carter's plan was to run in all of the primaries and caucuses, beginning with the Iowa caucuses, and build up momentum by winning "somewhere" each time primary elections were held. Carter startled many political experts by finishing second in the Iowa caucuses (behind "uncommitted" and ahead of Indiana Senator Birch Bayh). Arizona Congressman Morris Udall, who had been leading in the polls at one point, came in fifth behind former Oklahoma Senator Fred R. Harris, leading Harris to coin the term "winnowed in", referring to his surprisingly strong showing. Carter then won the New Hampshire primary on February 24, thus proving that a Southerner could win in the North. He then proceeded to slowly but steadily accumulate delegates in primaries around the nation. He also knocked his key rivals out of the race one by one. He defeated former Alabama Governor George Wallace in the North Carolina primary March 23, thus eliminating his main rival in the South. He defeated Washington Senator Henry "Scoop" Jackson in Pennsylvania April 27, and Jackson quit the race. In the Wisconsin primary on April 6, Carter scored an impressive come-from-behind victory over Mo Udall, and eliminated Udall as a serious contender.

Idaho Senator Frank Church and California Governor Jerry Brown announced their candidacies for the Democratic nomination and defeated Carter in several late primaries. However, their campaigns started too late to prevent Carter from gathering the remaining delegates he needed to capture the nomination.

Candidates

Nominee

Eliminated at convention

Withdrew before convention

Favorite son candidates
The following candidates ran only in their home state or district's delegate elections for the purpose of controlling those delegates at the national convention:

 Senator Robert C. Byrd of West Virginia
 Mayor Walter Washington of the District of Columbia
 Delegate Walter Fauntroy of the District of Columbia

Declined to run
 Former Vice-President Hubert Humphrey of Minnesota
At multiple times during the primaries, Humphrey hinted at a campaign for the nomination and expressed his willingness to be drafted, but ultimately declined to actively seek the nomination on April 29, after Carter's victory in Pennsylvania. Several unsuccessful draft movements were formed and many uncommitted delegates expressed their preference for Humphrey.

 Senator Ted Kennedy of Massachusetts
 Mayor of New York City John Lindsay
 Senator George McGovern of South Dakota
 Senator Walter Mondale of Minnesota (formed exploratory committee)
 Senator Edmund Muskie of Maine
 Senator Adlai Stevenson III of Illinois
 Senator John Tunney of California

Polling

National polling

Before August 1974

August 1974–January 1976

1976

Head-to-head polling
Kennedy v. Wallace

Kennedy v. Muskie

Kennedy v. Jackson

Primaries

Overview

Scoop Jackson raised his national profile by speaking out on Soviet Union–United States relations and Middle East policy regularly, and was considered a front-runner for the nomination when he announced the start of his campaign in February 1975. Jackson received substantial financial support from Jewish-Americans who admired his pro-Israel views, but Jackson's support of the Vietnam War resulted in hostility from the left wing of the Democratic Party.

Jackson chose to run on social issues, emphasizing law and order and his opposition to busing. Jackson was also hoping for support from labor, but the possibility that Hubert Humphrey might enter the race caused unions to offer only lukewarm support.

Jackson made the decision not to compete in the early Iowa caucus and New Hampshire primary, which Carter won after liberals split their votes among four other candidates. Though Jackson won the Massachusetts and New York primaries, he dropped out on May 1 after losing the critical Pennsylvania primary to Carter by 12 points and running out of money.

Total popular vote in primaries
 Jimmy Carter - 6,235,609 (39.19%)
 Jerry Brown - 2,449,374 (15.39%)
 George Wallace - 1,955,388 (12.29%)
 Mo Udall - 1,611,754 (10.13%)
 Henry M. Jackson - 1,134,375 (7.13%)
 Frank Church - 830,818 (5.22%)
 Robert Byrd - 340,309 (2.14%)
 Sargent Shriver - 304,399 (1.91%)
 Ellen McCormack - 238,027 (1.50%)
 Fred R. Harris - 234,568 (1.47%)
 Milton Shapp - 88,254 (0.56%)
 Birch Bayh - 86,438 (0.54%)
 Walter Fauntroy - 10,149 (0.05%)
 Arthur O. Blessitt – 8,717 (0.06%)
 Walter Washington - 5,161 (0.03%)
 Lloyd Bentsen - 4,046 (0.03%)
 Terry Sanford - 404 (0.00%)

Democratic National Convention
The 1976 Democratic National Convention was held in New York City. By the time the convention opened Carter already had more than enough delegates to win the nomination, and so the major emphasis at the convention was to create an appearance of party unity, which had been lacking in the 1968 and 1972 Democratic Conventions. Carter easily won the nomination on the first ballot; he then chose Senator Walter Mondale of Minnesota, a liberal and a protege of Hubert Humphrey, as his running mate.

The tally at the convention was:
 Jimmy Carter - 2,239 (74.48%)
 Mo Udall - 330 (10.98%)
 Jerry Brown - 301 (10.01%)
 George Wallace - 57 (1.90%)
 Ellen McCormack - 22 (0.73%)
 Frank Church - 19 (0.63%)
 Hubert Humphrey - 10 (0.33%)
 Henry M. Jackson - 10 (0.33%)
 Fred R. Harris - 9 (0.30%)
 Milton Shapp - 2 (0.07%)
 Robert Byrd, Cesar Chavez, Leon Jaworski, Barbara Jordan, Ted Kennedy, Jennings Randolph, Fred Stover - each 1 vote (0.03%)

Vice presidential nomination

By June, Carter had the nomination sufficiently locked up and could take time to interview potential vice-presidential candidates.

The pundits predicted that Frank Church would be tapped to provide balance as an experienced senator with strong liberal credentials. Church promoted himself, persuading friends to intervene with Carter in his behalf. If a quick choice had been required as in past conventions, Carter later recalled, he would probably have chosen Church. But the longer period for deliberation gave Carter time to worry about his compatibility with the publicity-seeking Church, who had a tendency to be long-winded. Instead, Carter invited Senators Edmund Muskie, John Glenn and Walter Mondale, and Congressman Peter W. Rodino to visit his home in Plains, Georgia, for personal interviews, while Church, Henry M. Jackson, and Adlai Stevenson III would be interviewed at the convention in New York. Rodino revealed he had no interest in the position, and of all the other potential candidates, Carter found Mondale the most compatible. As a result, Carter selected Mondale as his running mate.

African American leadership within the Democratic Party had sought to potentially place Los Angeles Mayor Tom Bradley, Congressman Ron Dellums, or Congresswoman Barbara Jordan on the ticket with Carter. However, Jordan took herself out of consideration, and Carter did not have any interest in the other candidates put forward.

The vice presidential tally, in part, was:
Walter Mondale 2837
House Speaker Carl Albert 36
Ronald Dellums 20
Fritz Efaw 12
Barbara Jordan 17
Others 53

See also
Republican Party presidential primaries, 1976

References

1976 United States Democratic presidential primaries
Jerry Brown
Jimmy Carter
George Wallace
Walter Mondale